"Quincy / Kono Yo no Shirushi" is BoA's 13th Japanese single. "Kono Yo no Shirushi" is the song featured on Calpis commercial. This single was not included on any of her full studio albums but was on her best selling compilation album Best of Soul, which was also her second highest selling album.

Track listing 
 Quincy
 Kono Yo no Shirushi (コノヨノシルシ)
 Quincy (Instrumental)
 Kono Yo no Shirushi (コノヨノシルシ) (Instrumental)

Charts 
Oricon Sales Chart (Japan)

BoA songs
2004 singles
Torch songs
2004 songs
Avex Trax singles
Dance-pop songs
Songs with lyrics by Chinfa Kan
Songs written by Harry Sommerdahl